is a Japanese footballer currently playing as a defender for Tegevajaro Miyazaki from 2023.

Career
On 17 March 2021, Kitamura joined J3 club, Fukushima United ahead for 2021 J3 League season. Although he will participate in 16 games in the 2022 season. On 14 November 2022, he left from the club after two years at Fukushima.

On 17 December 2022, Kitamura joined to J3 club, Tegevajaro Miyazaki from 2023 season.

Career statistics

Club
.

Notes

References

External links

1998 births
Living people
Association football people from Kanagawa Prefecture
Kanto Gakuin University alumni
Japanese footballers
Association football defenders
J3 League players
Shonan Bellmare players
Fukushima United FC players
Tegevajaro Miyazaki players